The Pack of Woman was a cabaret devised by Australian performer and director Robyn Archer, first performed in London in 1981. Although funny and entertaining, the work also set out to shock audiences into examining the role of women in Western society. The title is a metaphor for the game of life played according to rules in which sexual politics were critical.  In 1983, it was produced by Understudies (Sue Hill & Chris Westwood), directed by Archer and designed by Roger Kirk. It played seasons in Sydney, Melbourne, Adelaide and Canberra with a cast consisting of Jane Clifton, Judi Connelli and Michele Fawdon.

The Pack of Women was subsequently made into a 1986 television special for the ABC featuring Archer, Connelli, Tracy Harvey, Jo Kennedy and Meryl Tankard.
Described as "perhaps the most daring and unashamedly radical thing to happen to Aunty in a long time", it contained the first use of the word cunt on Australian television. The soundtrack won the inaugural ARIA Award for Best Original Soundtrack or Cast Album.

Television soundtrack

Track listing
 LP/Cassette

References

External links

ARIA Award-winning albums
Australian television films
1986 television films
1986 films
Films directed by Ted Robinson (TV director)
1980s English-language films